Lorai: Play to Live is an Indian Bengali sports drama film directed by Parambrata Chatterjee, which stars Prosenjit Chatterjee, Payel Sarkar and Indrasish Roy in lead roles. The film is produced by Shyam Sunder Dey under the Greentouch Entertainment.The film was released on 9 January 2015.

Synopsis
Sebastian Ryan (Prosenjit Chatterjee), an alcoholic ex-football star, is assigned the task of training the youths of a remote violence-torn village in Purulia. Though he is very sceptical about the task at the outset, circumstances force him to change his perception.

Cast 
 Prosenjit Chatterjee as Sebastian Ryan
 Payel Sarkar as Anuradha, Ryan's daughter
 Indrasish Roy as Deep Narayan Chowdhury
 Kanchan Mullick as Doha
 Kharaj Mukherjee as Mukhtar Alam
 Gargi Roychowdhury as Mukhtar's young sister
 Deepankar De as Sports Minister Balai Bhowmik
 Biswajit Chakraborty as Ryan's best friend
 Bharat Kaul as Defence Minister Damle
 Koushik Kar as Chipla
 Rajat Ganguly as Central Home Minister Swapan Maitra
 Alvito D'Cunha (special appearance)
 Apurbo Roy as Haagu
 Parambrata Chatterjee as Naxalite leader Manas (special appearance)
 Joydeep Mukherjee as a member of Indian Army
 June Malia as Ryan's wife

Release
Lorai was slated to release with Ebar Shabor, but the producers of this film backed it by a week to avoid competition.

Marketing
Greentouch Entertainment released the film's trailer on 2 December 2014 at the presence of the lead cast and the director. The film had a grand premiere at INOX of South City Mall.

Controversy
Lorai have run into trouble with the censor board. The board has asked the makers to get an NOC from the Animal Welfare Board of India for a chicken chase sequence. Story goes that the makers had not taken a prior NOC, which is mandatory for censoring a film. Says a source close to the unit, "In the synopsis of the film, there was no mention of the sequence and the Animal Welfare Board has raised an objection to it. The film, starring Prosenjit Chatterjee, is set for release this weekend; we are hoping things will be sorted out soon." A representative from the production house is already in Chennai to do the needful. Says Parambrata, "The review committee will look into the sequence featuring chickens.Hope things fall into place."

Critical response
Reviewer from The Times of India commented Lorai is a good-hearted film that gives us a fair share of drama, humour and, of course, football. And despite our inclination to draw parallels with hits that have similar storylines — like Chak De! India — Lorai still manages to make a good impression.

Neel Dutt of The Telegraph reviewed "Parambrata’s choice of genre as well as his concept set me thinking not just about the film but about contemporary Bengali cinema and its new breed of young filmmakers. It’s actually a breath of freshness to watch a young filmmaker daring to get away from the glossy plastic world of our city to engulf an earthy India far bigger than our provincial smartphone existence. The charm of the film lies in this rusticity, an essence that’s beautifully and painstakingly shot by cinematographer Gopi Bhagat. Kharaj Mukherjee’s ever optimistic and pleasing Mokhtar is the actor’s most pleasant performance since Patalghar. Just when one stopped expecting anything from Kanchan Mullick, he surprises as the chicken thief. His funny ostrich-like Doa with all its oddities and idiosyncrasies will keep you glued till the end. In fact, Doa’s perfectly crafted introduction and climax are two of the most enjoyable sequences in the film.But the surprise of the film lies in its two young actors — Indrasish Roy as Deepnarayan, the rakishly handsome captain of the football team, is stunning. And debutant Kaushik Kar as the quiet and confident Chipla Mahato is brilliant. Both these fine young actors show a lot of promise. I loved the gentle accordion melody accompanied by a stringed instrument used in a couple of scenes after Sebastian Ryan enters Kushumdi."IMDb gave a rating  to the film.

Soundtrack 
Music Composer Indradeep Dasgupta was roped in to score the music for the film. 

Arijit Singh launched the music of the film was held at a city hotel, with the entire cast and crew in attendance. The soundtrack was ranked Best Bengali Album of March 2015 by Deccan Music

Track listing

References

External links
 

Bengali-language Indian films
2010s Bengali-language films
2015 films